Rahbani a common Arabic family name.

Notable people with the surname include:

Rahbani brothers, the musical duo Assi Rahbani and Mansour Rahbani
Assi Rahbani, a Lebanese composer, musician and producer
Mansour Rahbani, Lebanese composer, musician, poet and producer
Elias Rahbani, Lebanese producer, lyricist, composer 
Ghassan Rahbani, Lebanese producer, lyricist, composer, arranger, orchestra conductor, pianist, and singer
Oussama Rahbani, Lebanese producer, lyricist, composer, arranger, orchestra conductor,
Ziad Rahbani, a Lebanese composer, pianist, performer, playwright, and political commentator